What if Gargiulo Finds Out? is a 1988 Italian comedy film written and directed  by Elvio Porta and starring Giuliana De Sio and Richard Anconina.

Plot

Cast

 Giuliana De Sio as Teresa Capece 
 Richard Anconina as Ferdinando 
  Mario Scarpetta as  Roberto  
  Nicola Di Pinto as  Friariello 
  Gea Martire as  Ernestina 
  Giuseppe De Rosa as  Auricchio 
  Nunzia Fumo as   Teresa's Mother-in-law 
 Enzo Cannavale as   Teresa's Father
 Pino Ammendola as   Ferdinando's Friend 
  Marzio Honorato as  Organizer of the Riffa
  Franco Javarone as  De Crescenzo 
 Gianfranco Barra as Health Inspector
 Franco Pistoni as  Scarrafone
  Mico Galdieri as  Troncone

References

External links

Italian comedy films
1988 comedy films
1988 films
Films set in Naples
Films about the Camorra
1988 directorial debut films
1980s Italian films